Akpan is both a surname and a given name. Notable people with the name include:

Surname:
Andre Akpan (born 1987), American soccer player
"Arnee Akpan (born 1997), Nigerian Poet and Author 
Bassey Akpan (born 1984), Nigerian footballer
Hope Akpan (born 1991), English footballer
Ime Akpan (born 1972), Nigerian hurdler
Rita Akpan (born 1944), Nigerian politician
Uwem Akpan (born 1971), Nigerian Jesuit priest and writer

Given name:
Akpan Isemin (1939–2009), Nigerian politician
Akpan Okon, 18th-century African ruler